Swear and Shake was an indie folk band based out of Nashville, Tennessee.  Formed in 2010 by Kari Spieler (vocals, lyrics, guitar), Adam McHeffey (vocals, lyrics, guitar, banjo), the band included Shaun Savage (electric bass). Time Out New York described their sound as "postcard-perfect indie folk with an undercurrent of sly humor." Swear and Shake self-identify their sound as "Big Hook Americana". The band relocated from Brooklyn, New York to Nashville, Tennessee, in November, 2014, to write their second full-length record. On November 23, 2017, via social media, the band announced their breakup and that they will be moving onto new projects after 7 years as Swear and Shake.

The Sound of Letting Go LP 
In 2016 Swear and Shake ran a second crowdfunding campaign for "The Sound of Letting Go," their second full-length set of recordings. It was recorded in Richmond, VA, at Spacebomb Studios. The 13-track LP was on June 2, 2017, under the band's independent label, Pots and Pans Records.

Maple Ridge LP

In 2012 Swear and Shake released their debut album Maple Ridge.  The band's campaign to fund the record through the crowd funding website Kickstarter exceeded its goal by $750.00. The record gained the band attention amongst notable independent music blogs, with My Old Kentucky Blog featuring Swear and Shake in their New Band Smell section, multiple features in The Deli Magazine, and The Blue Indian naming Swear and Shake as their Band Of The Month for December 2012.

Members 
Current:
 Adam McHeffey (2010–present)
 Kari Spieler (2010–present)
 Shaun Savage (2010–present)
Past Members:
 Tom Elefante (2010 - 2012)
 Benny Goldstein (2013 - 2015)

Discography

References

Indie rock musical groups from New York (state)
Musical groups from Brooklyn